Edinger is a surname. Notable people with the surname include:

Claudio Edinger (born 1952), Brazilian photographer
Edward F. Edinger (1922–1998), medical psychiatrist, Jungian analyst and American writer
Eva-Maria Edinger (born 1966), former synchronized swimmer from Austria
Evan Edinger (born 1990), American-born YouTuber living in London
Ludwig Edinger (1855–1918), German anatomist and neurologist and co-founder of the University of Frankfurt
Paul Edinger (born 1978), former gridiron football placekicker
Rudolf Edinger (1902–1997), Austrian weightlifter
Tilly Edinger (1897–1967), German-American paleontologist and the founder of paleoneurology

See also
Edinger–Westphal nucleus, parasympathetic pre-ganglionic nucleus that innervates the iris sphincter muscle and the ciliary muscle
Edward Edinger House, located in the West End of Davenport, Iowa, United States

German-language surnames